Agustín Bossio (born 15 November 1983) is an Argentine former professional footballer who played as a goalkeeper.

Club career
Bossio was in Colón's youth team. In 2007, Bossio joined Primera B Nacional side Patronato. He didn't make a first-team appearance until 2013, prior to that he spent time out on loan. Ben Hur of Torneo Argentino A loaned Bossio in 2010, while Torneo Argentino B's Atlético Paraná temporarily signed him in 2011. He made a total of thirty appearances for the two clubs, notably suffering relegation with Ben Hur. He returned in 2012 and subsequently made his pro debut in February 2013. On 24 February, Bossio was subbed on for the final minutes versus Ferro Carril Oeste after a Sebastián Bertoli red card.

He featured in a further two fixtures for Patronato during 2012–13. In the following five seasons, Bossio made just one appearance whilst appearing as an unused substitute seventy-one times. On 31 August 2017, Bossio made a permanent move to rejoin Atlético Paraná. A serious knee injury forced Bossio into retirement, which he announced in April 2020.

Coaching career
After retiring, Bossio took up concurrent coaching roles at Liga Santafesina clubs Náutico El Quillá and Juventud Unida de Candioti.

Career statistics

References

External links

1983 births
Living people
Footballers from Santa Fe, Argentina
Argentine footballers
Association football goalkeepers
Torneo Argentino B players
Torneo Argentino A players
Primera Nacional players
Argentine Primera División players
Torneo Federal A players
Club Atlético Patronato footballers
Club Sportivo Ben Hur players
Club Atlético Paraná players